The Battle of Marj Rahit was one of the early battles of the Second Fitna. It was fought on 18 August 684 between the Kalb-dominated armies of the Yaman tribal confederation, supporting the Umayyads under Caliph Marwan I, and the Qays under al-Dahhak ibn Qays al-Fihri, who supported the Mecca-based Abdallah ibn al-Zubayr; the latter had proclaimed himself Caliph. The Kalbi victory consolidated the position of the Umayyads over Bilad al-Sham (the Islamic Levant), paving the way for their eventual victory in the war against Ibn al-Zubayr. However, it also left a bitter legacy of division and rivalry between the Qays and the Yaman, which would be a constant source of strife and instability for the remainder of the Umayyad Caliphate.

Background
At the death of Mu'awiya I, the founder of the Umayyad Caliphate, in 680, the Muslim world was thrown into turmoil. Although Mu'awiya had named his son, Yazid I, as his heir, this choice was not universally recognized, especially by the old Medinan elites, who challenged the Umayyads' claim to the succession. Among them, the two chief candidates for the caliphate were Alid Husayn ibn Ali, and Abdallah ibn al-Zubayr. Husayn at first attempted an outright revolt against the Umayyads, but this resulted in his death at the Battle of Karbala in October 680, leaving Ibn al-Zubayr as the leading contender. As long as Yazid lived, Ibn al-Zubayr denounced his rule from the sanctuary of Mecca but did not openly claim the Caliphate, instead insisting that the Caliph should be chosen in the traditional manner, by a tribal assembly (shura) from among all the Quraysh. After the open revolt of Medina against Umayyad rule, in 683 Yazid sent an army to Arabia that defeated the Medinans and laid siege to Mecca, the holiest city of Islam, but Yazid's death in November forced the expeditionary force to return home.

Yazid was succeeded by his son, Mu'awiya II, but he died a few weeks later and never enjoyed any real authority outside the family's traditional stronghold of Bilad al-Sham. His death provoked a crisis, since his other brothers were too young to succeed. As a result, Umayyad authority collapsed across the Caliphate and Ibn al-Zubayr was accepted by most of the Muslims as their new leader: the Umayyad governor of Iraq, Ubayd Allah ibn Ziyad, was evicted from the province, coins in Ibn al-Zubayr's name were minted in Persia, and the Qaysi tribes of northern Syria and the Jazira (Upper Mesopotamia) went over to his cause. The governor of Homs, Nu'man ibn Bashir al-Ansari, and the Himyarites who dominated his district supported Ibn al-Zubayr, as did Natil ibn Qays, who expelled the pro-Umayyad governor of Palestine, his rival within the Judham tribe Rawh ibn Zinba. Even some members of the Umayyad family considered going to Mecca and declaring their allegiance to him. In central and southern Syria, however, the Umayyad cause was upheld by the local tribes, led by the Banu Kalb under Ibn Bahdal and Ibn Ziyad. At their initiative, a shura of the loyal tribes was held at Jabiya, where Marwan ibn al-Hakam, a distant cousin of Mu'awiya I who had been a close aide of Caliph Uthman ibn Affan, was elected as the Umayyads' caliphal candidate.

Opening skirmishes and the battle of Marj Rahit 
Marwan's election provoked the reaction of the Qays, who rallied around the Governor of Damascus, al-Dahhak ibn Qays al-Fihri. After vacillating between the two candidates, al-Dahhak was persuaded to recognize Ibn al-Zubayr, and began assembling his forces on the field of Marj al-Suffar near Damascus. In response, the Umayyad coalition marched on Damascus, which was surrendered to the Umayyads by a member of the Ghassanid tribe.

The two armies first clashed in mid-July 684 at the plain of Marj al-Suffar, and the Qays were pushed towards Marj Rahit, a plain some 17 kilometres northeast of Damascus (between the modern cities of Douma and Adra). Twenty days of skirmishing between the two camps followed, until the final battle took place on 18 August. The numbers of the two opponents are uncertain: al-Tabari puts Marwan's forces at 6,000, another tradition at 13,000 and 30,000 for Marwan and al-Dahhak respectively, while Ibn Khayyat inflates the numbers to 30,000 and 60,000 respectively. The traditions agree, however, that the Umayyad forces were considerably outnumbered. Marwan's commanders were Abbad ibn Ziyad, Amr ibn Sa'id al-As and Ubayd Allah ibn Ziyad (another tradition has Ubayd Allah commanding the cavalry and Malik ibn Hubayra al-Sakuni the infantry), while only one of al-Dahhak's commanders, Ziyad ibn Amr ibn Mu'awiya al-Uqayli, is known.

A plethora of anecdotes, individual accounts, and poems on the battle survives, but the details of the battle itself are not clear, except that the day resulted in a crushing Umayyad victory: the main leaders of the Qays, including al-Dahhak, fell in the field. Nikita Elisséeff explains the Umayyad success by the possible defection of Qays-aligned tribes during the preceding weeks, eager to uphold the Syrian hegemony over the Caliphate. In addition, Elisséeff points out that the Umayyads still controlled the state treasury in Damascus, allowing them to bribe tribes to join them. The remnants of the Qays army fled to Qarqisiya under Zufar ibn al-Harith al-Kilabi, and Marwan was officially proclaimed as Caliph at Damascus.

Aftermath 
The victory at Marj Rahit secured the Umayyads' position in Syria, and allowed them to go onto the offensive against Ibn al-Zubayr's supporters. Egypt was recovered later in the year, but an attempt to recover Iraq under Ubayd Allah ibn Ziyad was defeated by pro-Alid forces under al-Mukhtar near Mosul in August 686. Abd al-Malik, who had succeeded his father Marwan I after the latter's death in April 685, thereafter restricted himself to securing his own position, while Mus'ab ibn al-Zubayr defeated al-Mukhtar and gained control of all of Iraq in 687. In 691, Abd al-Malik managed to bring Zufar al-Kilabi's Qays back into the Umayyad fold, and advanced into Iraq. Mus'ab ibn al-Zubayr was defeated and killed, and Umayyad authority re-established across the East. In October 692, after another siege of Mecca, Abdallah ibn al-Zubayr was killed, and the civil war ended.

Impact 

The most enduring legacy of Marj Rahit was the hardening of the Qays–Kalb split in Syria, which was paralleled in the division and rivalry between the Mudar, led by the Banu Tamim, and the Rabi'a and Azd alliance in Iraq. Together, these rivalries caused a realignment of tribal loyalties into two tribal confederations or "super-groups" across the Caliphate: the "North Arab" or Qays/Mudar block, opposed by the "South Arabs" or Yemenis, although these terms were political rather than strictly geographical, since the properly "northern" Rabi'a adhered to the "southern" Yemenis. The Umayyad caliphs tried to maintain a balance between the two groups, but this division and the implacable rivalry between the two groups became a fixture of the Arab world over the following decades, as even originally unaligned tribes were drawn to affiliate themselves with one of the two super-groups. Their constant contest for power and influence dominated the Umayyad Caliphate, creating instability in the provinces, helping to foment the disastrous Third Fitna and contributing to the Umayyads' final fall at the hands of the Abbasids. The division continued long after: as Hugh N. Kennedy writes, "As late as the nineteenth century, battles were still being fought in Palestine between groups calling themselves Qays and Yaman".

References

Sources 
 
 
 
 
 
 
 
 

Marj Rahit 684
680s in the Umayyad Caliphate
684
Banu Kalb
Marj Rahit
Qays
Second Fitna
Syria under the Umayyad Caliphate